Testament is a 1996 video game by Insanity. It is a horror First-person shooter.

Plot 
The game follows a soldier who participates in an expedition to find crypt of the ancient magus Ghuwta. Ghuwta a powerful sorcerer who ruled a strong empire was 4,000 years ago. The player's character gets separated from the expedition and has to escape the haunted land.

Gameplay 
The game has similar gameplay to Wolfenstein 3D and Doom. There are 16 levels in the game and the player has to find a piece of scroll (the eponymous Testament) in an every single level. The piece is usually hidden behind  a door and so player has to find a key first. To fight enemy player can use four weapons -a basic handgun, a machine-gun, a fireball-gun and a double-gun.

Development 
The game was developed by Insanity. Filip Doksanský originally intended Testament to be a port of Wolfenstein 3D''' for Amiga. The game was introduced in 1996, during Amiga Workshop. The game was released the same year.

 Reception 
The game has received generally favourable reviews. Andy Smith gave the game 92% in his review. He commented it as "a splendid game that concentrates on making the gaming experience as enjoyable as possible." Another reviewer, Joachim Froholt, commented Testament as "a hugely entertaining and atmospheric game which stands up surprisingly well when compared to the best 3D shooters of today."

In the Czech magazine Amiga Review the game scored with 60%. The review praised the atmosphere, gameplay and music. On the other hand, it criticised the technical aspect of the game such as AI of enemies or the engine.

 Legacy 
A sequel, Testament II'', was produced by Insanity in 1998. It was the last title released by the team. Its members later founded the company Black Element Software.

References 

1996 video games
First-person shooters
1990s horror video games
Amiga games
Amiga-only games
Video games developed in the Czech Republic
Video games with 2.5D graphics
Video games about demons
Single-player video games
Sprite-based first-person shooters